Sarah Marshall (born 1 June 1981) is a French model and actress.

Biography 
Sarah Marshall is the granddaughter of Michèle Morgan and William Marshall, the daughter of Mike Marshall, the niece of Mike's half-sister, Tonie Marshall, and the great-grandniece of Micheline Presle.
She is married to Alexandre Anthony, the son of Richard Anthony. Together they have a son, Zoltan. Alexandre and Sarah have a tumultuous relationship which they describe in their common book, Les Amants du destin.

Filmography
 Sexy Boys (2001)
 Andalucia (2007)

Book
Les Amants du Destin - Sarah Marshall, Alexandre Anthony and Alain Morel - JML Ed. - 1 May 2004 -

References

External links

 

1981 births
Living people
French film actresses
French people of American descent
Place of birth missing (living people)
French female models
21st-century French actresses